Eduard Suess (20 August 1831 - 26 April 1914) was an Austrian geologist and an expert on the geography of the Alps. He is responsible for hypothesising two major former geographical features, the supercontinent Gondwana (proposed in 1861) and the Tethys Ocean.

Biography 

Eduard Suess was born on 20 August 1831 in London, England, the oldest son of Adolph Heinrich Suess, a Lutheran Saxon merchant, and mother Eleonore Friederike Zdekauer. Adolph Heinrich Suess was born on 11 March 1797 in Saxony, Holy Roman Empire and died on 24 May 1862 in Vienna, Austrian Empire, German confederation; Eleonore Friederike Zdekauer was born in Prague, nowadays part of the Czech Republic, which once belonged to the Holy Roman Empire and the Austrian Empire. 

When Eduard Suess was born, his family relocated to Prague, and then to Vienna when he was 14. He became interested in geology at a young age. While working as an assistant at the Hofmuseum in Vienna, he published his first paper—on the geology of Carlsbad (in present-day Czech Republic)—when he was 19. In 1855, Suess married Hermine Strauss, the daughter of a prominent physician from Prague. Their marriage produced five sons and one daughter.

In 1856, he was appointed professor of paleontology at the University of Vienna, and in 1861 was appointed professor of geology. He gradually developed views on the connection between Africa and Europe. Eventually, he concluded that the Alps to the north were once at the bottom of an ocean, of which the Mediterranean was a remnant. Suess was not correct in his analysis, which was predicated upon the notion of "contractionism"—the idea that the Earth is cooling down and, therefore, contracting. Nevertheless, he is credited with postulating the earlier existence of the Tethys Ocean, which he named in 1893. He claimed in 1885 that land bridges had connected South America, Africa, India, Australia, and Antarctica. He named this ancient broken continent Gondwanaland.

Suess published a comprehensive synthesis of his ideas between 1885 and 1901 titled Das Antlitz der Erde (The Face of the Earth), which was a popular textbook for many years. In volume two of this massive three-volume work, Suess set out his belief that across geologic time, the rise and fall of sea levels were mappable across the earth—that is, that the periods of ocean transgression and regression were correlateable from one continent to another. His theory was based upon glossopteris fern fossils occurring in South America, Africa, and India. His explanation was that the three lands were once connected in a supercontinent, which he named Gondwanaland. Again, this is not quite correct: Suess believed that the oceans flooded the spaces currently between those lands.

In his work Die Entstehung der Alpen, Suess also introduced the concept of the biosphere, which was later extended by Vladimir I. Vernadsky in 1926. Suess wrote:

He was elected a member of the American Philosophical Society in 1886 and the Royal Swedish Academy of Sciences in 1895. He received the Wollaston Medal of the Geological Society of London in 1896 and he won the Copley Medal of the Royal Society in 1903. Suess died on 26 April 1914 in Vienna. He is buried in the town of Marz in Burgenland, Austria.

Legacy 

Suess is considered one of the early practitioners of ecology. Suess Land in Greenland, the lunar crater Suess, as well as the crater Suess on Mars, are named after him.

Franz Eduard Suess  
His son, Franz Eduard Suess (1867–1941), was superintendent and geologist at the Imperial Geological Institute in Vienna, who studied moldavites and coined the term tektite. The asteroid 12002 Suess, discovered by Czech astronomers Petr Pravec and Lenka Kotková in 1996, was named in his honor.

Works 
 Über die Brachiopoden der Kössener Schichten (1854)
 Der Boden der Stadt Wien (1862)
 Die Entstehung der Alpen (1875)
 Das Antlitz der Erde in three volumes (1885–1909)
 La face de la terre, (1897–1918), translation de l'allemand par Emmanuel de Margerie, préface par Marcel Bertrand
 The Face of the Earth, trans. of Das Antlitz der Erde in 5 vols. (1904–1924)
 Erinnerungen (1916)

References

External links 
 
 Plate Tectonics

1831 births
1914 deaths
19th-century Austrian geologists
Tectonicists
Members of the Royal Swedish Academy of Sciences
Foreign Members of the Royal Society
Foreign associates of the National Academy of Sciences
Recipients of the Copley Medal
Wollaston Medal winners
Austrian Protestants
Austrian people of British descent
Austrian people of German descent
People from London
Scientists from Prague
Scientists from Vienna
Members of the American Philosophical Society